The Order of Freedom and Independence is one of the highest North Korean orders. It is divided into two classes: the first class is awarded to commanders and partisan units of brigades, divisions, and higher military groups for bravery, courage, and auspicious command of military operations. The second class is awarded to the commanders of partisan regiments, battalions, companies, and detachments, as well as to civil professionals employed in the industry for the military. The order is awarded with the Order of the National Flag of the same rank.

The order was instituted on 7 July 1950, during the Korean War.

Two variants have been made: one Soviet-made with a twisting mechanism for attachment and a North Korean-made with a pin.

Recipients

During the Korean War, the order, first class, was received by 95 Koreans and 126 Chinese people and second class by 3,043 Koreans and 4,703 Chinese recipients.
Song and Dance Ensemble of the Korean People's Army, first class
Kim Hyong Gwon, first class
Ri Jong-ok, first class
Pak Song-chol, first class
Jo Myong-rok, first class
Kim Jong-il, first class (twice)

See also
Orders, decorations, and medals of North Korea

References

External links

ОРДЕН СВОБОДЫ И НЕЗАВИСИМОСТИ [Order of Freedom and Independence] in pictures 

Orders, decorations, and medals of North Korea
Korean War
Military awards and decorations